The 1968–69 Yugoslav Ice Hockey League season was the 27th season of the Yugoslav Ice Hockey League, the top level of ice hockey in Yugoslavia. Eight teams participated in the league, and Jesenice have won the championship.

Regular season

External links
 Season on hrhockey

Yugoslav
Yugoslav Ice Hockey League seasons
1968–69 in Yugoslav ice hockey